The 2022 12 Hours of Sebring (formally known as the 70th Mobil 1 Twelve Hours of Sebring Presented by Advance Auto Parts) was an endurance sports car race  held at Sebring International Raceway near Sebring, Florida from 16 to 19 March 2022. It was the second round of both the 2022 IMSA SportsCar Championship and the Michelin Endurance Cup. JDC-Mustang Sampling Racing entered as the defending overall winners of the 12-hour event.

Background
2022 marked the return of the "Super Sebring" weekend, in which both the IMSA SportsCar Championship and FIA World Endurance Championship would compete during the same weekend; the 12 hour event joining the 1000 Miles of Sebring. Last held in 2019, the WEC round was canceled in 2020 and 2021 due to the effects of the COVID-19 pandemic. The 2022 date also fell on the same weekend as the IndyCar Series round at Texas Motor Speedway, prompting several full-time IndyCar competitors to vacate their seats for the event. 

On March 9, 2022, IMSA released the latest technical bulletin outlining Balance of Performance for the event. Changes were made from the BoP tables most recently established at the 2021 season-ending Petit Le Mans, as the 24 Hours of Daytona featured its own unique BoP tables. No changes were made across the three prototype classes, while several changes were made in GTD and GTD Pro. The Acura NSX GT3 Evo22 was given a 20 kilogram weight reduction as well as turbo boost tweaks, while the new BMW M4 GT3 and Chevrolet Corvette C8.R (in GTD trim) were given 5 and 20 kilogram weight reductions respectively following the 24 Hours of Daytona. The McLaren 720S GT3 received a slight turbo boost reduction, while the Lexus RC F GT3 received a minor horsepower increase. The Mercedes-AMG GT3 received a 10 kilogram weight reduction. On Friday morning, the Corvette received a mid-event adjustment, gaining 20 additional horsepower and a fuel capacity increase of 4 liters.

Supporting the race during the week were IMSA's Michelin Pilot Challenge and Porsche Carrera Cup North America.

Entries

A total of 53 cars took part in the event, split across five classes. 7 were entered in DPi, 8 in LMP2, 10 in LMP3, 11 in GTD Pro, and 17 in GTD.

All seven cars which contested the season-opening 24 Hours of Daytona returned, albeit with altered driver lineups. Neel Jani was drafted in to replace Kevin Magnussen in Chip Ganassi Racing's #02 entry, with Magnussen rejoining Haas F1 Team following the departure of Nikita Mazepin. Meyer Shank Racing's Hélio Castroneves was replaced by Stoffel Vandoorne due to the former's IndyCar commitments, while Ryan Hunter-Reay (Chip Ganassi Racing) and José María López (Ally Cadillac Racing) replaced Scott Dixon and Jimmie Johnson respectively for the same reason. LMP2 saw eight of the ten entries return, with G-Drive Racing by APR's pair of entries being the lone absence. In LMP3, Mühlner Motorsport dropped to a single entry, while Jr III Racing and FastMD Racing made their 2022 debuts, boosting the class to 10 entries. 

GTD Pro saw the introduction of Racers Edge Motorsports and their Acura NSX GT3 Evo22, while WeatherTech Racing returned with their #97 Mercedes-AMG GT3 Evo following a planned one-off at the 24 Hours of Daytona. Aaron Telitz also replaced Texas-bound Kyle Kirkwood in the #12 Lexus, while Scott Andrews filled Telitz's seat in the #14. The absence of KCMG's Porsche, the #4 Corvette, and WeatherTech Racing's #15 Mercedes saw the entry list fall to 11.

17 cars were listed in GTD, five fewer than the field that contested the 24 Hours of Daytona. Paul Miller Racing made their 2022 debut, while entries from Team TGM, TR3 Racing, GMG Racing, T3 Motorsport, SunEnergy1 Racing, and Northwest AMR were dropped.

Qualifying

Qualifying results

Results

Race 

References

External links

12 Hours of Sebring
12 Hours of Sebring
12 Hours of Sebring
2022 WeatherTech SportsCar Championship season